Tomort, or Tomurty, is the highest peak in the Karlik Mountains, a far eastern subrange of the Tien Shan mountain range in Xinjiang, China. While not of great absolute elevation among Chinese peaks, it is well-separated from higher terrain, and hence has a high topographic prominence.

Tomort was reconnoitered or attempted in 1996, 1997, 2000, and 2004, by Chinese and Japanese parties. Its first, and to date only, ascent was in 2005, by a small group from the Alpine Club of the National Defense Academy of Japan, led by Isao Fukura. They described the summit as a "table-top ice-snow plateau, with glaciers several kilometers long descending on all sides," which was reached by "a crevassed glacier and a 50 degree snow/ice face."

See also
 List of Ultras of Central Asia

References

External links

Mountains of Xinjiang
Four-thousanders of the Tian Shan